The Pembina oil field is one of the largest and most prolific conventional oil fields in the province of Alberta, Canada.

The mature field is centered on Drayton Valley and is named for the Pembina River, which crosses the region from southwest to northeast. It taps reservoirs in the Cretaceous formations of the Western Canada Sedimentary Basin for oil and gas production. The main hydrocarbon-bearing unit is the Cardium Formation. Production also comes from the Viking Formation and sandstone beds of the Fernie Formation such as the Rock Creek Member.

History
The first oil was discovered by Mobil Oil in February 1953, and it started a boom that saw the investment of $900 million in the area.

Gallery

References

Brazeau County
Oil fields of Alberta
ExxonMobil oil and gas fields